St Paul's Walden is a village about  south of Hitchin in Hertfordshire, England. The civil parish of St Paul's Walden also includes the village of Whitwell and the hamlet of Bendish. At the 2011 Census the population of the civil parish was 1,293.

After the Reformation the manor belonged to St Paul's Cathedral; the name St Paul's Walden serves to distinguish the parish from King's Walden, although the Dean and Chapter sold their property in the 17th century.

Notable residents 
St Paul's Walden has two 18th-century mansions.

Stagenhoe 
Stagenhoe was once owned by the Earls of Caithness

Sir Arthur Sullivan rented the property in the 1880s around the time he composed The Mikado.

St Paul's Walden Bury 
St Paul's Walden Bury is owned by the Bowes-Lyon family. Members include Queen Elizabeth The Queen Mother. While the details of her birth in 1900 are uncertain, the house is one of the locations that has been posited as her birthplace. It is accepted that she was baptised in All Saints' church, St Paul's Walden.

On 23 January 1923, the then Prince Albert, Duke of York, later to become King George VI, drove up to St Paul's Walden in his sports car, and proposed to Elizabeth in the woods at the Bury.

Gardens
The gardens of St Paul's Walden Bury are listed as grade I on the Register of Historic Parks and Gardens of Special Historic Interest in England.
They are occasionally opened to the public under the National Garden Scheme, a charity of which the Queen Mother was patron.

References

External links

St Paul's Walden Bury
Listed Buildings in St Paul's Walden

Saint Paul's Walden
Civil parishes in Hertfordshire
North Hertfordshire District